This was the first edition of the tournament.

Roberto Carballés Baena won the title after defeating Mikael Ymer 2–6, 6–0, 6–2 in the final.

Seeds
All seeds receive a bye into the second round.

Draw

Finals

Top half

Section 1

Section 2

Bottom half

Section 3

Section 4

References

External links
Main draw
Qualifying draw

Murcia Open - Singles